Avşa Island or Türkeli is a Turkish island in the southern Sea of Marmara with an area of about . It was the classical and Byzantine Aphousia ( or Ἀφησιά) and was a place of exile during the Byzantine period. The Greek inhabitants fled to Sarti Chalkidiki after the 1923 population exchange.

The island belongs to the Marmara District of Balıkesir Province in northwestern Turkey. It is a popular domestic tourist destination, especially for tourists from Istanbul. The local population is around 2,000 according to the last census, but during the summer season the number of visitors increases as far as forty to fifty thousand.

Transportation
The island is within reach from Istanbul by ship and ferry. It is also accessible from Erdek and Tekirdağ by motorboat.

Location

The exact location of Avşa island is shown in the following map in red color. The larger island north of Avşa is the island of Marmara and the island to the east is Paşalimanı.

See also
 1935 Erdek–Marmara Islands earthquake
 Balıkesir
 Marmara Island
 Paşalimanı
 Sea of Marmara

External links 

Islands of the Sea of Marmara
Islands of Turkey
Populated places in Balıkesir Province
Islands of Balıkesir Province